The 1943–44 Scottish Districts season is a record of all the rugby union matches for Scotland's district teams.

History

There was no Inter-City match this year due to the Second World War.

Glasgow District played an Army XV side.

Results

Inter-City

None.

Other Scottish matches

Glasgow District:

Army XV:

English matches

No other District matches played.

International matches

No touring matches this season.

References

1943–44 in Scottish rugby union
Scottish Districts seasons